This is a list of fictional creatures and aliens from the universe of the long-running BBC science fiction television series Doctor Who, including Torchwood, The Sarah Jane Adventures, K-9 and K-9 and Company. It covers alien races and other fictional creatures, but not specific characters. Individual characters are listed in separate articles.

Note that some information on the page is taken from spin-off media.

H

Haemovore

Haemovores appeared in the Seventh Doctor story The Curse of Fenric (1989) by Ian Briggs. Vampiric creatures that fed on blood, they were the result of human evolution in a possible far future, caused by millennia of pollution. As part of his final game against the Doctor, the entity known as Fenric transported the most powerful Haemovore, called the "Ancient One", through time to Viking Age Northumbria. There it waited, trapped beneath the North Sea for centuries, occasionally drawing victims into the water and transforming them into Haemovores.

Soon after the transformation, victims appeared much as they did in life, except for elongated fingernails and a corpse-like pallor. Later they became deformed blue-grey humanoids covered in octopus-like suckers. The Ancient One was the least human in appearance; in its own time, it was the last living thing on Earth.

During World War II, Fenric released the Ancient One. Fenric's plan was that the Ancient One was to release the toxin which would pollute the world and thus create its own future.

The Haemovores had the ability to hypnotically paralyse their victims so they could feed and drain them of blood. Not all of their victims were turned into Haemovores, although the selection process was never explained. The Haemovores were impervious to most forms of attack, surviving being shot at close range by a submachine gun at one point. They could be destroyed in the traditional vampire-killing fashion of driving a stake through their chests. They could also be repelled by their victim's faith, which formed a psychic barrier, like the Doctor's faith in his companions, Ace's faith in the Doctor, Captain Sorin's faith in the Communist Revolution, and even the Reverend Wainwright's failing faith in God; this repelling force can be called into will, the Doctor merely called the names of past companions as a medium.

Ultimately, the Seventh Doctor convinced the Ancient One to turn against Fenric, and it released the toxin within a sealed chamber, destroying itself and Fenric's host. Whether this means that the future the Ancient One came from was averted is not clear, although the Doctor seemed to think so.

Fenric and his Haemovores return in the 2012 Big Finish Productions audio story, Gods and Monsters.

Hath

The Hath are aliens that appear as tall, roughly humanoid creatures with fish-like heads, who can breathe in air via the employment of apparatus fitted to their faces that incorporates a canister of green liquid. They are intelligent, emotional creatures – one formed a friendship with Martha Jones, and saved her life at the cost of its own. They seem sentient and while they do not speak a language intelligible to humans, the two races planned to colonize the planet Messaline together. However, they later turned on each other – before their eventual reconciliation, thanks to the Doctor's intervention.

The Monster Files feature states that the Hath joined and assisted early human space colonisation.

The Hath returned for an appearance in the second part of "The End of Time" (2010), where they are seen in an alien bar, and they are seen briefly in "The Eleventh Hour" (2011) in a clip illustrating the Doctor's role as protector of the Earth, suggesting that they have visited the planet at some point prior to 2010.  They also appeared in an alien bar for the first episode of season 9.

Headless Monks

The Headless Monks are a religious order that can be converted from any humanoid species by the removal of the head. They wear hooded cloaks, giving the impression that they still have a head, however under the hood, the skin is tied into a tight knot where the head has been removed.  Despite their name, most people are unaware of this literal description being true, because except under very special circumstances, one incurs a death penalty if they ever remove the hood of a monk. The monks have no detectable life signs, and are endowed with the ability to throw lightning from their hands. They were first mentioned in "The Time of Angels" (2010), but did not appear until "A Good Man Goes To War" (2011).

Hoix

A Hoix features in the Torchwood episode "Exit Wounds" (2008); the first time its name has been mentioned on screen, having previously been seen in the Doctor Who episode "Love & Monsters" two years before. Owen distracts it by feeding it cigarettes stating that it "lives to eat". They are not
very intelligent, being easily tricked by Owen into being vulnerable for a knock-out blow to the head; it has been seen animalisticly chasing Rose and the Tenth Doctor in its first appearance. One appeared as a member of the Alliance to seal the Eleventh Doctor in the Pandorica in "The Pandorica Opens" (2010). A Hoix was also mentioned in the novel The Twilight Streets.

I

Ice Warrior

J

Judoon

The Judoon are galactic alien police resembling rhinoceroses that work for the Shadow Proclamation. They appeared in the series 3 Sarah Jane Adventures story, Prisoner of the Judoon, in pursuit of a Veil life form known as Androvax that escaped from a crashed Judoon prison transport. They have relatively low intelligence levels but possess sophisticated technology such as H2O Scoops that are capable of lifting large buildings and Thermal Guns that are able to disintegrate targets.

The Judoon first appeared as a major alien in the Doctor Who episode "Smith and Jones" as well as the episodes "The Pandorica Opens".

The Judoon have battled the Thirteenth Doctor in the episode Fugitive of the Judoon.

K

Kahler

A highly technologically advanced humanoid species with unique patterns on the left side of their faces to reflect their individuality. A Kahler doctor, Kahler-Jex, encountered the Eleventh Doctor, Amy Pond and Rory Williams in a small American frontier town known as Mercy, where it became apparent that he was responsible for the creation of a deadly Kahler cyborg, who was now hunting him down to execute Kahler-Jex for his crimes against the Kahler species.

Kaled

A species of humanoids from the planet Skaro who evolved into the fearsome and warlike Daleks.

Kinda

Kinda (pronounced "Kin-duh") are a species of human-like people. At first glance, one would assume they are similar to the caveman age humans. However, their necklaces seem similar to a double helix, implying they are smarter than they appear. They have legends of the Mara, and are warned not to dream alone to keep it away. The men of the Kinda are not allowed to speak, but if one does, a prophecy says all Kinda will. They have women similar to shamans, they speak almost fluently; when the elder dies, her spirit and knowledge enter her apprentice. A child in the Kinda tribe could have up to seven fathers, though this hasn't been elaborated on; although it could be one biological father and six stepfathers.

Kraal
 The Kraals reappear in a Big Finish story called 'The Oseidon Adventure', which was released in June 2012 as part of the Fourth Doctor Adventures.

Krafayis

The Krafayis appear in the episode "Vincent and the Doctor" (2010). It appears to be invisible to most people, however Vincent van Gogh can see it. It is suggested that this is because of his mental illness.

Krargs
Krargs appear in the unfinished serial Shada and consequently in its later Big Finish/BBCi remake. They are artificial crystalline organisms with rudimentary mobility and understanding of simple commands, created and controlled by the main antagonist, Skagra, to aid in his plan to forcefully merge all of the minds in the Universe into a single omnipotent entity.

Krillitane

The Krillitanes are a race who take attributes from other races to change their appearance. In the episode "School Reunion" (2006), the Tenth Doctor states that he has encountered them before, but that due to their composite nature, they looked different, hence him not recognizing them.

In order to solve the Skasis Paradigm, which would enable them to control the entire universe, they assume control of a school and take over, with many assuming human forms and taking roles such as teachers and catering staff – the Krillitane leader Brother Lassar takes on the role of the headteacher, using the alias "Mr Finch". The pupils are served free lunches which contain chips coated with Krillitane oil, which is toxic to the Krillitanes themselves, but is harmless to humans, and when consumed, causes increased intelligence – when the Doctor asks Rose (who had also eaten the chips) what is 59 times 35, she immediately answers the question correctly (2,065). But the oil is also extremely flammable, and when K9 ignites it, the ensuing explosion destroys the school and the Krillitanes inside.

Kroton

Krynoid

The Krynoids appeared in the Fourth Doctor story The Seeds of Doom by Robert Banks Stewart. They are a highly dangerous, sentient form of plant life which are renowned amongst galactic botanists. They spread via seed pods which travel in pairs and are violently hurled through space by frequent volcanic eruptions on their unnamed home planet. The pods when opened are attracted to flesh and are able to infect and mingle their DNA with that of the host, taking over their body and slowly transforming them into a Krynoid. The species can also exert a form of telepathic control over other plant life in the surrounding area, making it suddenly dangerous and deadly to animal-kind. In the later stages of development, the Krynoid can also control the vocal cords of its victims and can make itself telepathically sympathetic to humans. Fully grown Krynoids are many meters high and can then release hordes of seed pairs for further colonisation.

Two pods arrived on Earth at the South Pole during the prehistoric Pleistocene era and remained dormant in Antarctica until discovered at the end of the twentieth century. One of them hatched after being exposed to ultra-violet light, and took control of a nearby human scientist. The Fourth Doctor intervened in the nick of time and ensured the Krynoid was destroyed by a bomb, but the second pod was stolen and taken to the home of millionaire botanist Harrison Chase in England. Chase ensured the germination of the second pod, which overtook his scientific adviser Arnold Keeler, and transformed its subject over time into a virtually full-sized Krynoid. Unable to destroy the creature by other means, and with the danger of a seed release imminent from the massive plant, the Doctor orchestrated an RAF bombing raid to destroy the creature before it could germinate.

The Krynoid are also featured in the Eighth Doctor audio story for Big Finish entitled Hothouse, where an environmentalist group uses samples from the original Krynoid to try and create hybrids that can be controlled by the human host and thus control Earth's fauna to cope with the environmental damage, only for their efforts to merely create a rapidly-growing Krynoid before the Doctor sets it on fire. Also featured in BBV audios The Root of All Evil, and The Green Man.

A Krynoid appears as one of the villains in the Eleventh Doctor short story collection Tales of Trenzalore, as one of the creatures attacking Trenzalore during the Doctor's defence of the planet ("The Time of the Doctor", 2013), the Doctor defeating the Krynoid by blasting it with rapidly-freezing water from a specially modified hose and then shattering it with the reverberations of the town bell.

M

Macra

The Macra first appear in the 1967 Second Doctor story The Macra Terror by Ian Stuart Black. They are an intelligent, giant crab-like species from an unnamed planet colonised by humanity in the future. The Macra invade the control center of the colony and seize the levers of power without the colonists – including their Pilot – knowing what had happened. Thereafter the Macra only appear at night, when the humans are in their quarters, observing a curfew. They have strong hypnotic powers which alter human perception. They also have the ability to ensure messages are vocalised through electronic apparatus such as television or sensor speakers. Both these tools are used to keep the human colonists under control, believing they are blissfully happy. This provides a cover for the Macra to use the colonists as miners in a vast gas mine. The gas is deadly to the miners but vital to the Macra, enabling them to move more quickly and rejuvenating their abilities. The Second Doctor effects a revolution on the Macra planet and helps engineer an explosion in the control centre, destroying the Macra in charge.

The Macra are also featured in the 2007 episode "Gridlock", becoming the first one-off opponent of the Doctor in the classic series to appear in the revived series, with the Zygons reappearing in the Eleventh Doctor story, "The Day of the Doctor" (2013). In the episode, some Macra are found to be alive below New New York, a city of New Earth. They live in the thick fog of exhaust gases on the main motorway under the city, tracking the flying cars by their lights and snatching at them when they get too close. The Doctor says that the species is billions of years old and once developed a small empire as "the scourge of this galaxy", but the Macra beneath New New York must have devolved into nothing more than beasts.

Mara

Martian
In the Doctor Who universe, the planet Mars is home to two known forms of sentient life: the Ice Warriors, a race of reptilian humanoids, and The Flood, a sentient, water-borne virus encountered by the first human base on Mars in the episode "The Waters of Mars" (2009). The Tenth Doctor was incorrectly identified as a Martian by Donna Noble during their meeting in, "The Runaway Bride" (2006), with the Empress of the Racnoss.

Mechonoid 

Large, spherical robots created by humans to prepare the planet Mechanus for colonisation. They kept stranded astronaut Steven Taylor prisoner as he did not have their control codes. Daleks, pursuing the TARDIS crew, engaged the Mechonoids in battle. Which side was victorious is not shown. Spelt 'Mechanoid' in various subsequent comic strip appearances.

Menoptra

The Menoptra (spelled Menoptera in the novelisation of the serial) appeared in the First Doctor story The Web Planet, by Bill Strutton (1965). They are an intelligent, bipedal insectoid species from the planet Vortis. In appearance, they resemble a cross between giant butterflies and bees, with each Menoptra possessing four large wings. They have yellow and black stripes around their bodies and appear to be around six feet tall, but do not seem to have typical insect body parts (such as mandibles or an abdomen).

Peaceful and kindly by nature, the Menoptra move in a unique, stylised way and their vocal inflections are stilted. They were very welcoming of the First Doctor, Ian, Barbara, and Vicki; but showed an animosity towards their fellow insectoids, the Zarbi, as well as an abhorrence for the Animus, a hostile alien intelligence that had taken over the originally passive Zarbi and almost all of Vortis. Once it was clear that the Doctor was willing to help them defeat the Animus, they were only too glad to assist in any way they could.

Menoptra born without wings are considered second-class citizens.

A Menoptra and a Zarbi were shown on cover of the first edition of Doctor Who Annual in September 1965 along with two other Doctor Who alien races, a Voord and a Sensorite.

Minotaur

An alien Minotaur was imprisoned in a prison that resembled that of an Earth hotel in "The God Complex" (2011), however this "hotel" had never-ending corridors, and so established itself as a God, feeding from the fears of the beings that find them trapped in the hotel. The Eleventh Doctor realised that actually, the Minotaur is feeding on the people's faith that something or someone will save them from their worst fears, and so temporarily encourages his companion Amy Pond to lose her faith in him, which eventually allows the Minotaur to die peacefully in the corridors of the hotel. The Doctor mentions that this alien species of Minotaur are cousins of the Nimon.

Monk 

 
The Monks are an alien race of shapeshifting humanoids that can choose their appearance at will; on Earth, they chose to resemble human corpses. The Monks study other planets through virtual simulations and take over by having someone in power consent to their rule out of love.

In "Extremis" (2017), the simulated version of the Twelfth Doctor eventually realized the truth and emailed a recording of the Monks' simulation to the real Twelfth Doctor through his sonic sunglasses, warning him of the coming invasion.

In "The Pyramid at the End of the World" (2017), the Monks showed the assembled world leaders a future where the Earth would be destroyed in one year by bacteria and offered to protect them as their rulers. The Doctor planned to stop the bacteria by blowing up the laboratory where it was found, but realized he could not escape the explosion due to his blindness. Unwilling to let her friend die, Bill Potts consented to the Monks' rule in return for the Doctor's eyesight, allowing him to escape.

In "The Lie of the Land" (2017), the Monks ruled over Earth for six months and kept the humans control by broadcasting a revised version of the planet's history that included the Monks from the beginning. Bill, the lynchpin through whom the fake history was broadcast, broke her psychic link with the Monks by broadcasting pure memories of her mother, causing the Monks to lose control over humanity and ultimately retreat from Earth.

Movellan

The Movellans, who made their first appearance in the Fourth Doctor serial Destiny of the Daleks (1979), are an android species originating from outside the galaxy. They were adversaries of the Daleks.

Movellans outwardly resemble physically attractive humans of various ethnicities and genders. All Movellan androids wear white, form-fitting uniforms and have silver hair braided in a dreadlock style. They are stronger and have more physical endurance than human beings. A major weakness of the Movellan design is an external power pack which each android carries on its belt. This can be removed with comparative ease, causing the android to completely shut down. Once removed the power pack circuitry can be reprogrammed so that the android will obey the orders of another being.

The Movellans are mentioned again in Resurrection of the Daleks (1984), where a virus of their invention was central to that story's plot. They also appear in "The Pilot" (2017), where they are seen fighting the Daleks.

The Tenth Doctor audio series Dalek Universe sees the Doctor learn that the Movellans were based on the template of his former android companion Mark Seven, who was rebuilt after a devastating accident as part of a series of anti-Dalek measures.

Mentors

Mentors are amphibious capitalists who first appear in the serial "Vengeance on Varos".

N

Nestene

The Nestenes are a race of amorphous aliens who can control all forms of plastic, creating Autons. Since the Last Great Time War destroyed their food supply planets, the Nestenes have been seeking replacements.

Nimon

Minotaur-like beings that go to other planets, posing as gods. However, they are nothing more than a parasitic race that bleed planets dry before moving on to new ones in a repeating cycle. They are cousins to the Minotaur species that the Eleventh Doctor encountered in "The God Complex" (2011). While one posed as a god, it acquired sacrifices to be used as batteries for powering their teleporter. However, the Doctor's arrival prevented more Nimons from arriving; the rest tried a last-resort plan by blowing up their now resource-deprived planet, killing them all.

O

Ogron

Ogrons are mercenaries employed by various parties to "do their dirty work" throughout the universe. They strongly resemble Orcs or Uruk-hai from The Lord of the Rings, being large humanoids with thick gray skin, protruding brow ridges, and thick, tangled hair. They primarily employ stun weapons, and have been employed by both the Daleks and the Master on at least one occasion. They first appeared in the Third Doctor serial Day of the Daleks (1972).

Ood

Ogri

The Ogri appeared in the Fourth Doctor story The Stones of Blood (1978) by David Fisher.

The Ogri were a species of silicon-based creatures native to Ogros. They looked like large rocks, usually taller than a human but irregular in shape. They were large, slow and heavy, sometimes weighing as much as 3.5 tons, but they could take a lot of damage, both energy-based and physical. When they were awake, they would glow and make a loud rumbling noise. Like other silicon-based lifeforms, they broke down into grit when killed and also left silicon behind when they moved. They fed on various types of proteins which were common on Ogros. When on Earth, the Ogri had to rely on the globulin in blood, which they could absorb by touch. Ogri were not shown to communicate and did not show any signs of intelligence. Ogri had long lifespans, living for thousands of years.
Cessair of Diplos took three Ogri from Ogros, which she used for protection and to impress the humans of Earth. These Ogri waited with the Nine Travellers until they were awoken by Cessair or her followers.

Augmented Ogri were used by the Galactic Federation as doormen.

At least one Ogri was discovered on Earth prior to 1983, and ended up in the care of Isaac Summerfield in Little Caldwell. It resided in the cemetery and was routinely fed blood to keep it docile. It was instrumental in saving Little Caldwell from the attention of NATO, by killing a rogue NATO commander responsible for a number of abductions (both alien and human).

Optera

The Optera appeared in the First Doctor story The Web Planet (1965) by Bill Strutton. These caterpillar-like creatures were once Menoptra, but they elected to instead burrow under the ground and abandon the world of light and flight above. It is implied that they may have been driven there by the malevolent Animus.

They have larger eyes than their Menoptra brethren, and have no wings. However, they have numerous arms and appear to "hop" in a stylised way. They speak with inflection different from that of their bee-like cousins, but their speech is a strange dialect of the language of the "upper world" and words and phrases they have coined for themselves.

At the story's end, the Animus is defeated and the Optera are persuaded to return to the surface, where they look forward to their children learning the joys of flight; implying that once back on the surface the Optera will redevelop wings.

P

Peladonian

Peladonians appear humanoid, but are still in an age of a lack of advanced technology; at least when the Third Doctor visits the first time, when Peladon is being considered admittance into a galactic alliance. In the Doctor's first adventure, Peladon was ruled by a half human king named after the planet; his second trip saw him meeting King Peladon's daughter, a 1/4 human queen.

Pied Piper
Based on the mythical piper in the fairytale, the Pied Piper was an energy entity from the Jeggorabax Cluster, home to beings that feed on emotions. The species' spacecraft resembled meteorites; one such ship crash landed on Earth in the Weserbergland Mountains, Lower Saxony in 1283. Feeding off the emotion of fear, it assumed the human disguise of The Pied Piper and stole away all the children of the town of Hamelin, creating fear from parents.

The First Doctor, John and Gillian first meet the Pied Piper in the comic Challenge of the Piper. This is also the first story to ever feature the Pied Piper in Doctor Who.
Over the centuries, the creature continued to abduct children and terrify their parents, using many guises including Odd Bob the Clown, who kidnapped children in wartime New York. In the 2009 story The Day of the Clown, posing as both the ringmaster Elijah Spellman and as Odd Bob, the entity established a museum in Ealing named Spellman's Magical Museum of the Circus, made possible by the presence of the Weserbergland Meteorite at the Pharos Institute. Because of Sarah Jane Smith's affiliation with Pharos, she broke some of the meteorite and used it to trap the alien in it, after having weakened it by laughing at its clown form instead of fearing it. The meteorite was then sealed in a special emotion-proof container made out of Halconite steel in Sarah Jane's attic.

Plasmavore

Plasmavores are shape-changing aliens that live on haemoglobin. They absorb blood from their victims, which in turn changes their own blood chemistry to that of the victim, allowing them to mimic other species when medically scanned. A Plasmavore was hiding from the Judoon in the Royal Hope Hospital on Earth, disguised as Florence Finnegan.

P'ting

The P'ting have toxic skin, and will eat anything that is not organic including the Thirteenth Doctor's energy from her sonic screwdriver.

Pyrovile

See also
 List of Doctor Who villains
 List of Doctor Who henchmen
 List of Doctor Who robots

References

External links
 The Bumper Book of Doctor Who Monsters, Villains & Alien Species
 Children of the Earth BBC Torchwood site

Monsters and aliens
Doctor Who
Doctor Who monsters
 
Doctor Who lists
Monsters and aliens